The Last Warrior may refer to:

 The Last Warrior (1970 film), directed by Carol Reed
 The Last Warrior (1989 film)
 The Last Warrior (2000 film)
 The Last Warrior (2017 film)

See also
 The Final Executioner (1984), L'ultimo guerriero - Italy (original title), also known as The Last Warrior
 The Scythian (2018), Skif - Russia (original title), released as The Last Warrior in English-speaking markets